Paramachaerium is a genus of flowering plants in the family Fabaceae native to Amazonia. It was recently assigned to the informal monophyletic Pterocarpus clade within the Dalbergieae.

Species
Paramachaerium comprises the following species:
 Paramachaerium gruberi Brizicky
 Paramachaerium krukovii Rudd

 Paramachaerium ormosioides (Ducke) Ducke
 Paramachaerium schomburgkii (Benth.) Ducke
 Paramachaerium schunkei Rudd

References

Dalbergieae
Fabaceae genera
Taxonomy articles created by Polbot
Taxa named by Adolpho Ducke